Haney is a surname. Notable people with the surname include:

 Anne Haney, actress
 Bob Haney, comic book writer
 Carol Haney, dancer
 Chris Haney, Canadian co-creator of popular board game Trivial Pursuit
 David Haney, composer, pianist
 Daryl Haney, actor, screenwriter
 Enoch Kelly Haney, politician
 Eric L. Haney, security consultant
 Francis J. Heney, attorney, district attorney, Arizona Attorney General, and Assistant U.S. Attorney for Oregon
 Fred Haney, baseball player
 Hank Haney, golf instructor
 Henry Ryan Haney, politician
 Jack Haney, first person to drive across Canada in an automobile
 Kevin Haney, Academy Award winning make-up artist
 Larry Haney, baseball player & coach
 Lee Haney, bodybuilder
 Lewis Henry Haney, economist
 Lynn Haney, biographer
 Melissa Haney (b. 1981), first female Inuk pilot to reach the rank of captain
 Milton L. Haney, recipient of Medal of Honor
 Todd Haney, baseball player

Fictional characters:
 Mr. Haney, fictional TV character